The 2016 Tyrone Junior Football Championship was that year's annual Gaelic football tournament of Tyrone Junior Football Championship organized by Tyrone GAA. The winners of the event then represent Tyrone in the Ulster Junior Club Football Championship. Brackaville are the reigning champions following the 2015 Tyrone Junior Football Championship having beaten Aghaloo in the final on a scoreline of 0-9 to 0-8. However, as the winners of the Tyrone Junior Football Championship gain automatic promotion to the Tyrone Intermediate Football Championship for 2016 they cannot defend their title.

Teams

The 2016 Tyrone Junior Football championship is contested by 17 clubs from across the county of Tyrone.

2016 Tyrone Junior Football Championship

Fixtures

Preliminary round

First round

Quarter-finals

Semi-finals

Final

Ulster Junior Club Championship

The winners now progress onto the Ulster Junior Club Championship as the representatives of Tyrone.

All-Ireland Junior Club Championship

The winners now progress onto the All-Ireland Junior Club Championship as the representatives of Ulster.

References

Tyrone Junior Football Championship
Gaelic football competitions in County Tyrone